The National Basketball League Grand Final Most Valuable Player is an annual National Basketball League (NBL) award given since the league's inaugural season to the best performing player of the Grand Final series. The winner receives the Larry Sengstock Medal, which is named in honour of Larry Sengstock, the winner of the league's first Grand Final MVP award.

Winners

See also

WNBL Grand Final Most Valuable Player Award

References

Awards established in 1979
Most Valuable Player